Thylacandra is a genus of moths belonging to the subfamily Olethreutinae of the family Tortricidae.

Species
Thylacandra argyromixtana (Mabille, 1900)
Thylacandra endotera Diakonoff, 1983
Thylacandra malagassana (Saalmuller, 1880)
Thylacandra melanotoma Diakonoff, 1983
Thylacandra sycophyes Diakonoff, 1970

See also
List of Tortricidae genera

References

External links
tortricidae.com

Grapholitini
Tortricidae genera
Taxa named by Alexey Diakonoff